LiveChat is an online customer service software with online chat, help desk software, and web analytics capabilities.

It was first launched in 2002 and is currently developed and offered in a SaaS (software as a service) business model by LiveChat Software S.A.

Companies use LiveChat as a single point of contact to manage from one software all customer service and online sales activities that normally are provided using channels (chat, email and social media) and multiple tools.

Technology
Technically, LiveChat is a proprietary software built with the use of multiple technologies, including JavaScript, Node.js, MySQL, ElasticSearch, C++ and Erlang. The entire platform consists of two main elements: 

Website chat widget - embedded on customer's website and seen by the end users (website visitors) as a small chat box, traditionally displayed in the bottom right corner of the web browser. Chat widget is visible on desktop and mobile devices, either in the browser or as a part of mobile application.
Agent application - used by the company employees to respond to questions asked by the customers. Usually agents use the web-based application, which allows employees to log in and conduct a chat with website visitor using any browser. However, there are desktop applications available for Windows and Mac OS X and mobile apps for Android and iOS. BlackBerry and Windows Phone mobile apps used to exist in the past, but are no longer developed. Agent application is enhanced with user interface tools that make one-to-many communication quicker and more efficient. Examples of such tools include: canned responses, keyboard shortcuts, typing indicator with customer message sneak-peek, geolocation, tags system for categorization, etc.

There are two ways of having an online chat session between the agent and website visitor:
 Passive communication, started when the website visitor clicks on the chat button or widget displayed on the page. 
 Active communication, initiated manually by the agent or automatically by the LiveChat system as soon as the visitor meets the predefined criteria (i.e. searched keyword, time on website, encountered error, etc.). Once the criteria are met, LiveChat displays a chat invitation with a customized message. During the chat session, agents close the sales, which results in increasing the overall conversion rate.

In areas unrelated directly to the product, LiveChat relies on 3rd party services. This includes Postmark for the delivery of transactional emails, Recurly for subscription billing, Pingdom for performance monitoring and uptime tracking and Upscope for instant screen sharing with customers.

Features
Apart from website chat, other core features include: real-time website traffic monitoring, built-in ticketing system and agents' efficiency analytics.

System identifies the best prospects visiting a website based on data gathered from the purchasing decisions of 65 million buyers. Statistics section allows calculating the conversion from chat invitations into chat sessions and then into sales.

LiveChat is available in 48 languages: Arabic, Armenian, Azeri, Bulgarian, Catalan, Simplified Chinese, Traditional Chinese, Croatian, Czech, Danish, Dutch, English, Estonian, Farsi, Finnish, French, Georgian, German, Greek, Hebrew, Hindi, Hungarian, Icelandic, Indonesian, Italian, Japanese, Kazakh, Korean, Latvian, Lithuanian, Malagasy, Malaysian, Norwegian (bokmål), Norwegian (nynorsk), Polish, Portuguese, Brazilian Portuguese, Romanian, Russian, Serbian, Slovak, Slovene, Spanish, Swedish, Thai, Turkish, Ukrainian, Vietnamese.

Customer service platform
First available as closed solution, LiveChat has turned over time into an open and scalable customer service platform. It created an own ecosystem of applications, companies and services supporting business communication with tools such as:
 API documentation and multiple points of integration within the application and communication protocol,
 Community - for connecting users and 3rd party developers, partners and experts,
 Partner Program - for app and service monetization,
 Marketplace - for distribution of applications and experts' services.

Criticism
Among generally positive reviews, there are comments that emphasize the high cost of the product, especially when compared to cheap or free solutions available on the market. Lack of freemium version and expensive pricing are mentioned by customers who also admit that "range of features & services" justify the price.

Critical reviews claim that "bigger businesses may find the price minimal considering the benefit the product brings, but for start-ups or smaller businesses, it may put LiveChat out of their financial reach".

Research
Since 2014 LiveChat has been publishing Customer Service Report - an annual study of customer satisfaction and analysis of online business communication trends. It includes research of thousands of companies and millions of customer service email and live support interactions.

See also
 LiveChat Software

References

External links
 Official website

Business software companies
Cloud applications
Customer relationship management software companies
Customer relationship management software
Help desk
Polish brands
Web analytics
Web applications